Krasnoarmeyskaya is a rural locality (a village) in Pervomaysky Selsoviet, Sterlitamaksky District, Bashkortostan, Russia. The population was 241 as of 2010. There are 2 streets.

Geography 
Krasnoarmeyskaya is located 57 km northwest of Sterlitamak (the district's administrative centre) by road. Abdrakhmanovo is the nearest rural locality.

References 

Rural localities in Sterlitamaksky District